Kupchak/ Kupczak is a Polish surname and may refer to:
  (1917-1999), Polish road racing cyclist
 Mateusz Kupczak (born 1992), Polish footballer 
 Mitchell "Mitch" Kupchak (born 1954), retired American basketball player and general manager of the Los Angeles Lakers and Charlotte Hornets, National Polish-American Sports Hall of Fame member
 Szczepan Kupczak (born 1992), Polish Nordic combined skier
 Volodymyr Kupchak (born 1978), Ukrainian politician, member of the Verkhovna Rada

See also
 Kipchaks
 
 

Polish-language surnames
pl:Kupczak
de:Kupczak